Je suis timide mais je me soigne is a French comedy film directed by Pierre Richard released in 1978.

Plot 
Pierre Renaud, receptionist in a big hotel, suffers from a crippling shyness. When he falls in love with Agnès, winner of a contest, he decides to overcome his shyness and follows Agnès during all her trip.

Cast 
 Pierre Richard as Pierre Renaud
 Aldo Maccione as Aldo Ferrari
 Mimi Coutelier as Agnès
 Jacques François as Monsieur Henri
 Catherine Lachens as the female truck driver
 Robert Dalban as the garagist
 Jacques Fabbri as the truck driver
 Robert Castel as Trinita
 Jean-Claude Massoulier as Gilles
 Francis Lax as the wine waiter
 Hélène Manesse as Irène

Additional information 
The film was a commercial success, Pierre Richard reformed his collaboration with Aldo Maccione the next year in the film C'est pas moi, c'est lui.
The film took place in Vichy in the department of Allier, in Nice on the Promenade des Anglais and at the Hotel Negresco, and at Deauville during winter.

External links 

1978 films
French comedy films
1978 comedy films
1970s French films